Anthony Armand Ferguson Padilla (born February 12, 1984) is an American professional mixed martial artist. He currently competes in the Lightweight division in the Ultimate Fighting Championship (UFC). He is a former Interim UFC Lightweight Champion. Ferguson debuted in 2008, and has been with the UFC since he won The Ultimate Fighter 13 in 2011. He is trained in freestyle wrestling, boxing, jiu-jitsu, Muay Thai, and Wing Chun.

Early life
Ferguson was born in Oxnard, California, on February 12, 1984, but grew up mainly in Muskegon, Michigan. He is of Mexican heritage. His surname of Ferguson comes from his Scottish American stepfather.

Ferguson was a three-sport athlete at Muskegon Catholic Central High School in American football, baseball, and wrestling. He was the starting defensive back for the 2000 Division 8 state football champions and was a three-time All-State selection in wrestling, winning the 152-lb division in 2002.

After high school, Ferguson enrolled at Central Michigan University before transferring to Grand Valley State University. He also did a stint at Muskegon Community College. He did not complete his degree, but had a successful collegiate wrestling career, winning the 2006 National Collegiate Wrestling Association national wrestling championship in the 165-lb division.

Following college, Ferguson moved back to California to be closer to his extended family, working in marketing and sales during the day and picking up shifts as a bartender at night. One night, while working a bar shift, a patron noticed Ferguson's cauliflower ear and struck up a conversation about his wrestling background. The patron was a trainer at a local MMA gym and invited him to work with some young mixed martial artists on their wrestling. Shortly after this, he decided to pursue a professional mixed martial arts (MMA) career.

Mixed martial arts career

Early career
Ferguson began his professional MMA career fighting in small organizations around California in 2007. Notable matches in his early career include a win over kickboxing champion Joe Schilling and a loss to future World Extreme Cagefighting (WEC) fighter Karen Darabedyan.

The Ultimate Fighter
Ferguson applied to compete in the UFC's reality series The Ultimate Fighter multiple times. In 2010, he was finally accepted to compete in season 13 of the series after amassing a 10–2 professional record and winning the welterweight championship in PureCombat. He competed as a welterweight on The Ultimate Fighter: Team Lesnar vs. Team dos Santos.

Ferguson was selected as the third pick for Team Lesnar. In his first fight, Ferguson defeated Justin Edwards by knockout in the first round. He next faced Ryan McGillivray in the quarterfinals and won by a TKO in the first round. He then faced Chuck O'Neil in the semifinals and won by TKO in the third round to advance to the final.

Ultimate Fighting Championship
Ferguson officially made his UFC debut at the Ultimate Fighter 13 Finale against Ramsey Nijem to determine the winner of The Ultimate Fighter 13. Ferguson defeated Nijem by knockout in the first round to win a UFC contract. He also received the Knockout of the Night bonus.

Following his debut, Ferguson returned to lightweight and faced Aaron Riley on September 24, 2011, at UFC 135. The fight was stopped after the first round after Riley said he had a broken jaw, resulting in a TKO victory for Ferguson.

Ferguson then faced MMA veteran Yves Edwards at the Ultimate Fighter 14 Finale. Ferguson won via unanimous decision (30–27, 30–27, and 29–28).

Ferguson was expected to face Dennis Hallman on May 5, 2012, at UFC on Fox: Diaz vs. Miller. Hallman pulled out of the bout with an injury and replaced by Thiago Tavares. Then, Tavares was forced out of the bout with an injury and replaced by Michael Johnson. Ferguson lost the fight by unanimous decision.

After over a year away from competition while healing an arm injury incurred in his last fight, Ferguson returned to face Mike Rio on October 19, 2013, at UFC 166. He won by D'Arce choke submission in the first round. The win also earned him his first Submission of the Night award.

Ferguson faced Katsunori Kikuno on May 24, 2014, at UFC 173. He won the fight by knockout in the first round.

Ferguson was expected to face Danny Castillo on August 2, 2014, at UFC 176. After UFC 176 was cancelled, Castillo/Ferguson was rescheduled and took place on August 30, 2014, at UFC 177. Ferguson won the fight via split decision.

Ferguson faced Abel Trujillo on December 6, 2014, at UFC 181. Ferguson won the bout in the second round by submission.

Ferguson was expected to face Yancy Medeiros on February 28, 2015, at UFC 184. Medeiros pulled out of the bout, citing injury, and was replaced by Gleison Tibau. Ferguson won the fight by submission in the first round which also earned him a Performance of the Night bonus.

Ferguson faced Josh Thomson on July 15, 2015, at UFC Fight Night 71. He won the fight via unanimous decision (30–27, 30–27, and 30–26) and earned his second straight Performance of the Night bonus.

Ferguson was expected to face Khabib Nurmagomedov on December 11, 2015, at the Ultimate Fighter 22 Finale. Nurmagomedov pulled out of the fight in late October, citing injury, and was replaced by Edson Barboza. After a back-and-forth first round that had Ferguson docked one point due to an illegal upkick, Ferguson finished Barboza with a D'Arce choke submission in the second round. He earned his third consecutive Performance of the Night bonus as well as a Fight of the Night bonus.

A rematch with Michael Johnson was briefly scheduled for March 5, 2016, at UFC 196. On January 27, it was announced that Johnson withdrew from the bout due to injury. In turn, the bout with Nurmagomedov was rescheduled and expected take place on April 16, 2016, at UFC on Fox 19. On April 5, Ferguson pulled out of the bout due to a lung issue. He was replaced by promotional newcomer Darrell Horcher.

Ferguson was expected to face Michael Chiesa on July 13, 2016, at UFC Fight Night 91. Chiesa pulled out of the fight on June 27, citing injury, and was replaced by promotional newcomer Lando Vannata. Ferguson won his second straight fight via D'Arce choke and was awarded another Fight of the Night bonus.

Ferguson fought former champion Rafael dos Anjos on November 5, 2016, at the Ultimate Fighter Latin America 3 Finale. He won the fight by unanimous decision. Both participants were awarded Fight of the Night, which gave Ferguson his sixth post-fight bonus in his past five fights.

The pairing with Nurmagomedov was scheduled for a third time at UFC 209, this time for the interim UFC Lightweight Championship. Prior to the weigh-ins for the event, Nurmagomedov was hospitalized due to the ill effects of his weight cut, and the bout was cancelled yet again.

Ferguson faced Kevin Lee on October 7, 2017, at UFC 216 for the interim UFC Lightweight Championship. He won the bout by triangle choke submission in the third round.

A bout with Nurmagomedov had been scheduled for the fourth time on April 7, 2018, at UFC 223. On April 1, 2018, Ferguson reportedly tore his fibular collateral ligament while walking on the set for a pre-fight media obligation and was forced to withdraw from the event.

Ferguson faced Anthony Pettis on October 6, 2018, at UFC 229. He won the bout via corner stoppage after two rounds. Pettis' longtime cornerman and coach, Duke Roufus, informed the referee that he would not continue after suffering a broken hand. Their performance earned both participants Fight of the Night honors.

Ferguson next faced Donald Cerrone on June 8, 2019, at UFC 238. He won the fight via TKO due to a doctor stoppage after Cerrone blew his nose between rounds 2 & 3 which caused his swollen right eye to completely close, rendering him unable to continue. This fight earned both participants Fight of the Night honors.

Losing Streak
Ferguson was scheduled to face Khabib Nurmagomedov for the UFC Lightweight Championship on April 18, 2020, at UFC 249, but after Nurmagomedov was unable to leave Russia due to restricted air travel as a result of the coronavirus pandemic, Ferguson then agreed to compete for the Interim UFC Lightweight Championship against a late replacement in Justin Gaethje at the event. On April 9, UFC president Dana White announced that this event was postponed and the bout eventually took place on May 9, 2020. He was outstruck by Gaethje for all five rounds, eventually losing the fight via TKO in the fifth round. This fight earned both participants Fight of the Night honors.

Ferguson faced Charles Oliveira on December 12, 2020, at UFC 256. He lost the fight via unanimous decision after being dominated and controlled on the ground for most of the fight.

Ferguson faced Beneil Dariush on May 15, 2021, at UFC 262. He lost the fight via unanimous decision being once again controlled on the ground for the majority of the match.

Ferguson faced former Bellator Lightweight Champion Michael Chandler on May 7, 2022 at UFC 274. Despite a strong first round, Ferguson lost the fight via knockout early in the second round.

Ferguson was scheduled to return to the welterweight division to face Li Jingliang on September 10, 2022, in the co-main event of UFC 279. However, Ferguson instead moved up to the main event to face Nate Diaz, after his original opponent Khamzat Chimaev was pulled from their fight due to missing weight. Ferguson lost the fight via a guillotine choke submission in the fourth round.

Personal life 
Ferguson has a son, Armand Anthony, with his wife, Cristina Ferguson. In March 2019, Cristina filed a restraining order against Tony, alleging uncharacteristic behavior such as severe paranoia, not sleeping for days, tearing apart their home fireplace, and believing that a tracking chip was inserted into his leg during reconstructive knee surgery. She did not allege physical abuse, and filed the restraining order as a precautionary measure to get him help for his mental state. By April 2019, she had dropped the order, and he began to resume MMA.

Ferguson is known as one of MMA's most eccentric personalities. He constructed his own custom training apparatus at his house in Big Bear Lake, California and regularly posts videos of his unique workouts on his personal Instagram page. These include using a wing chun dummy smacking his arms and legs against metal poles to build bone strength, throwing baseballs off a pitcher's mound to build power for right-hand punches, swinging a hammer while balanced on a gym ball, and somersault jumps over tall stacks of gym mats. Fellow fighters have regularly commented on these unorthodox routines, and other fighters such as Belal Muhammad have even parodied Ferguson's training videos on their own personal social media pages. Ferguson has written on his Twitter account that he eschews sparring in training as he "finds it limits my creativity" when fighting.

Championships and accomplishments

Amateur wrestling
National Collegiate Wrestling Association
NCWA National Champion (2006)
NCWA All-American (2006, 2007)
North Central Conference Champion (2006, 2007)
Michigan High School Athletic Association
MHSAA Division IV State Champion (2002)
MHSAA Division IV All-State (2000-2002)

Mixed martial arts
 Ultimate Fighting Championship
 Interim UFC Lightweight Championship (One time)
 The Ultimate Fighter 13 winner
  Fight of the Year (one time) vs. Anthony Pettis
 Fight of the Night (Six times) vs. Edson Barboza, Lando Vannata, Rafael dos Anjos, Anthony Pettis, Donald Cerrone and Justin Gaethje
 Knockout of the Night (One time) 
 Submission of the Night (One time) 
 Performance of the Night (Three times) 
 Tied (Khabib Nurmagomedov) for the longest win streak in Lightweight Division history (12)
 PureCombat
 PureCombat Welterweight Championship (One time)
 World MMA Awards
 2018 Fight of the Year vs. Anthony Pettis at UFC 229

Mixed martial arts record

|-
|Loss
|align=center|25–8
|Nate Diaz
|Submission (guillotine choke)
|UFC 279
|
|align=center|4
|align=center|2:52
|Las Vegas, Nevada, United States
|
|-
|Loss
|align=center|25–7
|Michael Chandler
|KO (front kick)
|UFC 274
|
|align=center|2
|align=center|0:17
|Phoenix, Arizona, United States
|
|-
|Loss
|align=center|25–6
|Beneil Dariush
|Decision (unanimous)
|UFC 262 
|
|align=center|3
|align=center|5:00
|Houston, Texas, United States
|
|-
|Loss
|align=center|25–5
|Charles Oliveira
|Decision (unanimous)
|UFC 256
|
|align=center|3
|align=center|5:00
|Las Vegas, Nevada, United States
|
|-
|Loss
|align=center|25–4
|Justin Gaethje
|TKO (punch)
|UFC 249
|
|align=center|5
|align=center|3:39
|Jacksonville, Florida, United States
|
|-
|Win
|align=center|25–3
|Donald Cerrone
|TKO (doctor stoppage)
|UFC 238
|
|align=center|2
|align=center|5:00
|Chicago, Illinois, United States
|
|-
|Win
|align=center|24–3
|Anthony Pettis
|TKO (corner stoppage)
|UFC 229
|
|align=center|2
|align=center|5:00
|Las Vegas, Nevada, United States
|
|-
|Win
|align=center|23–3
|Kevin Lee
|Submission (triangle choke)
|UFC 216
|
|align=center|3
|align=center|4:02
|Las Vegas, Nevada, United States
|
|-
|Win
|align=center|22–3
|Rafael dos Anjos
|Decision (unanimous)
|The Ultimate Fighter Latin America 3 Finale: dos Anjos vs. Ferguson
|
|align=center|5
|align=center|5:00
|Mexico City, Mexico
|
|-
|Win
|align=center|21–3
|Lando Vannata
|Submission (brabo choke)
|UFC Fight Night: McDonald vs. Lineker
|
|align=center|2
|align=center|2:22
|Sioux Falls, South Dakota, United States
|
|-
|Win
|align=center|20–3
|Edson Barboza
|Submission (brabo choke)
|The Ultimate Fighter: Team McGregor vs. Team Faber Finale
|
|align=center|2
|align=center|2:54
|Las Vegas, Nevada, United States
|
|-
|Win
|align=center|19–3
| Josh Thomson
|Decision (unanimous)
| UFC Fight Night: Mir vs. Duffee
| 
|align=center|3
|align=center|5:00
| San Diego, California, United States
|
|-
|Win
|align=center|18–3
| Gleison Tibau
|Submission (rear-naked choke)
| UFC 184
| 
|align=center|1
|align=center|2:37
| Los Angeles, California, United States
|
|-
|Win
|align=center|17–3
|Abel Trujillo
|Submission (rear-naked choke)
|UFC 181
|
|align=center|2
|align=center|4:19
|Las Vegas, Nevada, United States
|
|-
|Win
|align=center|16–3
|Danny Castillo
|Decision (split)
|UFC 177
|
|align=center| 3
|align=center| 5:00
|Sacramento, California, United States
|
|-
|Win
|align=center|15–3
|Katsunori Kikuno
|KO (punch)
|UFC 173
|
|align=center| 1
|align=center| 4:06
|Las Vegas, Nevada, United States
|
|-
|Win
|align=center| 14–3
|Mike Rio
|Submission (brabo choke)
|UFC 166
|
|align=center| 1
|align=center| 1:52
|Houston, Texas, United States
|
|-
|Loss
|align=center|13–3
|Michael Johnson
|Decision (unanimous)
|UFC on Fox: Diaz vs. Miller
|
|align=center| 3
|align=center| 5:00
|East Rutherford, New Jersey, United States
|
|-
|Win
|align=center| 13–2
|Yves Edwards
|Decision (unanimous)
|The Ultimate Fighter: Team Bisping vs. Team Miller Finale
|
|align=center| 3
|align=center| 5:00
|Las Vegas, Nevada, United States
|
|-
|Win
|align=center| 12–2
|Aaron Riley
|TKO (jaw injury)
|UFC 135
|
|align=center| 1
|align=center| 5:00
|Denver, Colorado, United States
|
|-
|Win
|align=center|11–2
|Ramsey Nijem
|KO (punches)
|The Ultimate Fighter: Team Lesnar vs. Team dos Santos Finale
|
|align=center|1
|align=center|3:54
|Las Vegas, Nevada, United States
|
|-
|Win
|align=center|10–2
|Brock Jardine
|TKO (punches)
|PureCombat 12: Champions for Children
|
|align=center|4
|align=center|2:35
|Clovis, California, United States
|
|-
|Win
|align=center|9–2
|David Gardner
|TKO (punches)
|CA Fight Syndicate: Battle of the 805
|
|align=center|2
|align=center|0:27
|Ventura, California, United States
|
|-
|Win
|align=center|8–2
|Chris Kennedy
|TKO (doctor stoppage)
|National Fight Alliance MMA: Resurrection
|
|align=center|1
|align=center|2:29
|Ventura, California, United States
|
|-
|Loss
|align=center|7–2
|Jamie Toney
|Submission (triangle choke)
|National Fight Alliance MMA: MMA at the Hyatt 3
|
|align=center|1
|align=center|2:15
|Westlake Village, California, United States
|
|-
|Win
|align=center|7–1
|James Fanshier
|Decision (unanimous)
|Rebel Fighter
|
|align=center|3
|align=center|5:00
|Placerville, California, United States
|
|-
|Win
|align=center|6–1
|Devin Benjamin
|TKO (punches and elbows)
|National Fight Alliance MMA: MMA at the Hyatt II
|
|align=center|1
|align=center|0:51
|Westlake Village, California, United States
|
|-
|Win
|align=center|5–1
|Daniel Hernandez
|TKO (punches)
|National Fight Alliance MMA: Riot at the Hyatt
|
|align=center|1
|align=center|2:22
|Westlake Village, California, United States
| 
|-
|Loss
|align=center|4–1
|Karen Darabedyan
|Decision (unanimous)
|All Star Boxing: Caged in the Cannon
|
|align=center|3
|align=center|3:00
|Montebello, California, United States
| 
|-
|Win
|align=center|4–0
|Frank Park
|Submission (neck crank)
|Long Beach Fight Night 3
|
|align=center|1
|align=center|2:43
|Long Beach, California, United States
|
|-
|Win
|align=center|3–0
|Joe Schilling
|Submission (rear-naked choke)
|Total Fighting Alliance 12
|
|align=center|2
|align=center|2:12
|Long Beach, California, United States
|
|-
|Win
|align=center|2–0
|Brandon Adams
|TKO (punches)
|Total Fighting Alliance 11: Pounding at the Pyramid
|
|align=center|2
|align=center|2:18
|Long Beach, California, United States
|
|-
|Win
|align=center|1–0
|Steve Avalos
|TKO (submission to punches)
|California Xtreme Fighting: Anarchy at the Arena
|
|align=center|2
|align=center|1:25
|Upland, California, United States
|
|-

Mixed martial arts exhibition record

|-
|Win
|align=center|3–0
|Chuck O'Neil
|TKO (punches)
|rowspan=3|The Ultimate Fighter 13
| (airdate)
|align=center|3
|align=center|3:10
|rowspan=3|Las Vegas, Nevada, United States
|
|-
|Win
|align=center|2–0
|Ryan McGillivray
|TKO (punches)
| (airdate)
|align=center|1
|align=center|0:46
|
|-
|Win
|align=center|1–0
|Justin Edwards
|KO (upkick)
| (airdate)
|align=center|1
| align=center|3:56
|

Pay-per-view bouts

See also
List of current UFC fighters
List of male mixed martial artists

References

External links

1984 births
Living people
American male mixed martial artists
Mixed martial artists from California
Mixed martial artists utilizing Wing Chun
Mixed martial artists utilizing collegiate wrestling
Mixed martial artists utilizing Brazilian jiu-jitsu
American mixed martial artists of Mexican descent
Sportspeople from Oxnard, California
Grand Valley State University alumni
Lightweight mixed martial artists
Sportspeople from Muskegon, Michigan
Sportspeople from Ventura County, California
Ultimate Fighting Championship male fighters
American Wing Chun practitioners
American practitioners of Brazilian jiu-jitsu
People awarded a black belt in Brazilian jiu-jitsu